Against Political Equality: The Confucian Case is a 2019 book by Tongdong Bai in which the author advocates a domestic governance that is influenced by Confucianism, possessing both meritocratic characteristics and democratic elements. Bai argues that egalitarianism and its analogous system of liberal democracy sometimes conflict with good governance and the protection of liberties, and that restriction of democracy is necessary for preservation of liberty.

Reception 
In Financial Times, Rana Mitter billed Against Political Equality as a "powerful and lively [contribution] to a major debate that has a long way to go."

References 

2019 non-fiction books
American non-fiction books
Books in political philosophy
Confucian texts
English-language books
Political theories
Social theories
Princeton University Press books